Lawa Cottica Airstrip , is an airstrip serving Cottica, Suriname. Cottica is on the Lawa River, which forms part of the eastern border of Suriname.

Charters and destinations 
Charter airlines serving this airport are as follows:

See also

 List of airports in Suriname
 Transport in Suriname

References

External links
OurAirports - Lawa Cottica
Lawa Cottica Airstrip

Airports in Suriname
Sipaliwini District